Scopula neoxesta is a moth of the  family Geometridae. It is found in Australia (Queensland).

References

Moths described in 1888
neoxesta
Moths of Australia